The D.I.C.E. Award for Strategy/Simulation Game of the Year is an award presented annually by the Academy of Interactive Arts & Sciences during the academy's annual D.I.C.E. Awards. This award recognizes games "in which user directs or manipulates resources to create a set of conditions that result in success as determined within the confines of the game. These games can offer the user the chance to simulate or to virtually reproduce an experience, real or imaginery, which would require some form of equipment. Strategy games emphasize the planning of tactics rather than the execution." Originally, there were separate awards for strategy games and simulation games, which simulate aspects of the real world.

The award's most recent winner is Dwarf Fortress developed by Bay 12 Games and was published by Kitfox Games.

History 
Initially the Interactive Achievement Awards had separate awards for Computer Strategy Game of the Year and Computer Simulation Game of the Year. These would be simplified to just Strategy Game of the Year and Simulation Game of the Year in 2005. The categories would be merged in Strategy/Simulation Game of the Year in 2008.
Computer Strategy Game of the Year (1998—2004)
Computer Simulation Game of the Year (1998—2004)
Strategy Game of the Year (2005—2007)
Simulation Game of the Year (2005—2007)
Strategy/Simulation Game of the Year (2008—present)

There was a tie between Age of Empires and StarCraft for Computer Strategy Game of the Year at the 1st Annual Interactive Achievement Awards.

Winners and nominees

1990s

2000s

2010s

2020s

Multiple nominations and wins

Developers and publishers 
Firaxis Games, as a developer, received the most nominations and has won the most awards. Microsoft and Xbox Game Studios, as a publisher, received the most nominations and has won the most awards.
There were numerous developers to have consecutive wins:
 Ensemble Studios: Won Computer Strategy Game of the Year for Age of Empires II in 2000 and the expansion pack The Conquerors in 2001.
 Maxis: Won (Computer) Simulation Game of the Year for The Sims expansion packs Unleashed in 2004, Superstar in 2005, and The Sims 2 in 2006.
 EA Los Angeles: Won in 2008 with Command & Conquer 3: Tiberium Wars and 2009 with Command & Conquer: Red Alert 3.
 Firaxis Games: Won in 2013 with XCOM: Enemy Unknown and 2014 with the expansion pack Enemy Within.
 Blizzard Entertainment: Won in 2015 with Hearthstone and 2016 with Heroes of the Storm.
When the were separate awards for strategy games and simulation games, both Microsoft and Electronic Arts had publish the winners for both categories in the same year:
 Microsoft:
 1998: Age of Empires for strategy and Microsoft Flight Simulator 98 for simulation.
 2000: Age of Empires II for strategy and Microsoft Flight Simulator 2000 for simulation.
 2001: Age of Empires II: The Conquerors for strategy and MechWarrior 4: Vengeance for simulation.
 Electronic Arts:
 1999: Sid Meier's Alpha Centauri for strategy and Need for Speed III: Hot Pursuit for simulation.
 2004: Command & Conquer: Generals for strategy and The Sims: Superstar for simulation.
Microsoft is also the only publisher to have back-to-back wins for both categories. Xbox Game Studios would have back-to-back wins in 2021 with Microsoft Flight Simulator and in 2022 with Age of Empires IV. Sega has published the most nominees without having published a winner.

Franchises 
All of the Sid Meier games, including the Civilization franchise, have received the most nominations for strategy/simulation games. The Sid Meier games are also tied with the Age of Empires and Microsoft Flight Simulator franchises for winning the most awards for strategy/simulation games.
There have been numerous games that had multiple nominations, mostly for expansion packs:
 Age of Empires II won Computer Strategy Game of the Year in 2000 and the expansion pack, The Conquerors won in 2001.
 The Sims expansion packs Unleashed and Superstar won Computer Simulation Game of the Year in 2003 and 2004, respectively.
 Rise of Nations was nominated for Computer Strategy Game of the Year in 2004 and the expansion pack Rise of Legends was nominated in 2007.
 Warhammer 40,000: Dawn of War II was nominated in 2010 and the expansion packs Chaos Rising and Retribution were nominated in 2011 and 2012, respectively.
 StarCraft II: Wings of Liberty won in 2011, and the expansion pack Heart of the Swarm was nominated 2014.
 Civilization V was nominated in 2011, and the expansion pack Brave New World was nominated 2014.
 XCOM: Enemy Unknown won in 2013, and the expansion pack Enemy Within won in 2014.
 XCOM 2 was nominated in 2017, and the expansion pack War of the Chosen was nominated in 2018.
Age of Empires II, XCOM: Enemy Unknown, and The Sims are the only games with back-to-back wins. The Sims franchise won a third consecutive year for Simulation Game of the Year with The Sims 2 in 2005. Warhammer 40,000: Dawn of War II is the only game that's been nominated three times. Command & Conquer had back-to-back wins with Command & Conquer 3: Tiberium Wars in 2008 and Command & Conquer: Red Alert 3 in 2009.

Notes

References 

D.I.C.E. Awards
Awards established in 1998